The Cedar Pocket Dam is a partially concrete gravity and rock and earth-fill embankment dam with an un-gated spillway located across the Deep Creek in the Wide Bay–Burnett region of Queensland, Australia. The main purpose of the dam is for irrigation, where the dam provides regulated water supplies along Deep Creek, a tributary of the Mary River.

Location and features

The dam is managed by Seqwater.

Recreation
There is a scenic lookout at Cedar Pocket Dam, however, picnic facilities and public toilets are unavailable.

References

Reservoirs in Queensland
Mary River (Queensland)
Wide Bay–Burnett
Dams in Queensland